Italy competed at the 2012 Winter Youth Olympics in Innsbruck, Austria. The Italian team consisted of 41 athletes competing in 15 different sports.

Medalists

Alpine skiing

Boys

Girls

Team

Biathlon

Boys

Girls

Mixed

Bobsleigh

Boys

Girls

Cross country skiing

Boys

Girls

Sprint

Mixed

Curling

Boys
Skip: Amos Mosaner
Second: Alessandro Zoppi

Girls
Third: Denise Pimpini
Lead: Arianna Losano

Mixed Team

Round-robin results

Draw 1

Draw 2

Draw 3

Draw 4

Draw 5

Draw 6

Draw 7

Quarterfinals

Semifinals

Gold Medal Game

Mixed doubles

Round of 32

Round of 16

Figure skating

Boys

Girls

Pairs

Mixed

Freestyle skiing

Ski Cross

Ice hockey

Girls

Luge

Boys

Girls

Team

Nordic combined

Boys

Short track speed skating

Boys

 * Given advantage due to fall caused by another skater.

Girls

Mixed

Skeleton

Boys

Girls

Ski jumping

Boys

Girls

Team w/Nordic Combined

Snowboarding

Girls

Speed skating

Boys

Girls

See also
Italy at the 2012 Summer Olympics

References

2012 in Italian sport
Nations at the 2012 Winter Youth Olympics
Italy at the Youth Olympics